Charles-François de Broglie, marquis de Ruffec (19 August 1719 – 16 August 1781), was a French soldier and diplomat from the House of Broglie. 

He served in the French Army and was one of the foremost diplomats in the service of Louis XV. He is chiefly remembered in connection with the Secret du Roi.

Biography
As second son of François-Marie, duc de Broglie, he was accorded the courtesy title of marquis de Ruffec.

After serving as a French military officer, he was seconded to the diplomatic service of King Louis XV. He served as Ambassador Extraordinary to Poland (1752–56), was recalled at the outbreak of the Seven Years' War, was appointed Chevalier des Ordres du Roi (1757), Lieutenant-General (1760), Commandant of Franche-Comté (1761–62), then after the Peace, Governor of Saumurois (1770). He is best remembered in connection with the Secret du Roi, the private—as distinct from the official—diplomatic service of Louis XV, of which he was the ablest and most important member. He held the post of Premier Colonel of Grenadiers.

The Marquis organized the famous Diner de Metz (8 August 1775), when the young Marquis de La Fayette was convinced by the guest of honour, the visiting Duke of Gloucester, brother of King George III, that the insurgents' revolt in America was in some measure justified. Broglie-Ruffec was involved with Beaumarchais in devising a scheme to offer secret support to the American Revolution in its early stages.

His funeral monument is in the Angouleme Cathedral and a portrait of him, painted by Norman-Michel-Hubert Descours in 1762, is at the Château de Bourdeilles.

Family
He married, 21 March 1759, Louise-Augustine de Montmorency (1735–1817); they had three daughters, Louise 1760-1827; Philippine 1762-1843; and Adelaide-Charlotte 1763-1847.

See also
 List of Ambassadors of France to the Kingdom of Great Britain

Notes

References

 

1719 births
1781 deaths
18th-century French diplomats
Charles-Francois
Marquesses of Ruffec
Diplomats from Paris
Ambassadors of France to Poland
Ambassadors of France to Great Britain
French generals
French military personnel of the Seven Years' War
French spies
Military personnel from Paris